The 1951 Xavier Musketeers football team was an American football team that represented Xavier University as an independent during the 1951 college football season. In its fifth season under head coach Ed Kluska, the team compiled a 9–0–1 record and outscored opponents by a total of 305 to 46. The team played its home games at Xavier Stadium in Cincinnati.

Schedule

References

Xavier
Xavier Musketeers football seasons
College football undefeated seasons
Xavier Musketeers football